Anton Fredrik Klaveness may refer to:

 Anton Klaveness (Anton Fredrik Klaveness, 1874–1958), Norwegian ship-owner
 Anton Fredrik Klaveness (1903–1981), Norwegian equestrian and ship-owner